Mothkur is a Municipality and also a  mandal headquarter situated in Yadadri Bhuvanagiri district in the Indian state of Telangana.It is also a Taluka ertswhile. Mothkur is located 100 kilometers away from the Telangana's capital city, Hyderabad.

Geography 

It has an average elevation of 292 metres (961 ft).

Etymology 
The name Mothkur evolved from Modhuga-luru.the village was rich in modhuga plants at olden times.

Demographics 

Mothkur town Total population is 12616 and number of houses are 3202. Female Population is 49.3%. town literacy rate is 64.2% and the Female Literacy rate is 27.5%. 

The population of Mothkur Mandal as per 2001 census is 55638 and 2011 census is 55699 with a very less growth % of 0.11.the nearby mandals are Addagudur, which was excerpted from mothkur as a new mandal.Mothkur municipality now emerged as a big town with population over twenty thousand people.

Politics 
Mothkur is situated in the assembly constituency of Tungathurty, and Parliamentary constituency of Bhuvanagiri.

It is a former Taluka. and this was under Ramannapet constituency earlier.

Mothkur is centre for Communist party movements in times of Telangana SayudhaPoratam and later times.

There are huge demands for a Government Degree college and TSRTC BusDepot ,  

30 bed government Hospital etc.

There is Widespread demand among people  to Declare Mothkur as Assembly constituency with Mothkur , Atmakur , Gundala , Addagudur mandals.

About Town 
Gundala, Mothkur and Atmakur were popularly known as TriSisters.(three sisters). It is a regional trade centre for the four mandals of Mothkur, Atmakur and Gundala and Addagudur. It is located on the banks of Bikkeru a tributary of Musi River which itself is a tributary of river Krishna. Roadways are the only mode of transport to this town. There are many kinds of shops and Markets that cater the needs of the people who live in villages surrounding Mothkur. 

Though the majority of the people are Hindus, the town has substantial presence of Muslims, and a little Christian community. The town has the Ramalingeshwara temple belonging to medieval India (probably Kakatiyas), Peddamma temple and SaiBaba temple pothaigadda. Sri venkateswara swamy tempe in Venkateswara colony. Some mosques and a missionary run chapel. Every year at Ramalingeshwara swamy temple a local festival called "Agni Gundalu (అగ్ని గుండాలు )" is conducted after the famous Hindu festival Holi. Many people attend for this local festival from nearby villages.

It is an agricultural town with a small sized food processing industry, mainly rice mills, and vegetable oil mills. Wet paddy is the major crop, other crops include cotton, fruits, and other vegetables and pulses. It is a developing town. Marketing of natural goods is the major source.Paddy marketing is the major resource.Also now mothkur is now hub for regional textile industry with handloom Cooperatives.

This town has one cinema theatre – Tara Theatre.

The town consists of Old Busstand, New Busstand and Pothaigadda. Old Mothkur is also called as the Old bus stand area. New Mothkur is well planned and has many residential colonies like the Drivers Colony, Padmashaali Colony, Teachers Colony, Lourdu Nagar, Venkateswara Colony and Sundarayya Colony. New busstand consists of RTC Busstand, police station and Zilla Parishad High School. The town has a pond named Pedda Cheruvu and that area called as Cheruvu katta on which there is a road towards Tirumalagiri and Thorrur. Mothkur Cheruvu was developed as Mini Tankbund by Govt. of telangana. Most of the government offices are situated after the crossing with the lake. That area was known as DaBunglow Area. Mothkur now became municipality under new municipal Act 2018., Merged some more places to Mothkur. The new places were kondagadapa, Rajanna gudem, Dharmapuram, Bujilapuram, Jamachetlabavi, Kondapuram. It now emerged as big town with population over twenty five thousand.

Education 
Sacred Heart High School, a christian missionary school, reputed all over the state, for producing talented students every year who were at high positions in various sectors and there are many other Private and public schools in mothkur, including Zillaparishad High School , Govt.primary school.

Government junior college was present at aregudem road of mothkur.

there are some private junior and degree colleges in mothkur.

LifeStyle and Culture 
The town has the Ramalingeshwara temple belonging to medieval India (probably Kakatiyas)  Every year at Ramalingeshwara swamy temple a local Antara helds it is called "Agni Gundalu (అగ్ని గుండాలు )" is conducted after the famous Hindu festival Holi. Peddamma Temple at new busstand. Muthyalamma Gudi at Cheruvukatta, famous for Bonalu.

Bathukamma and Dussera were celebrated with utmost joy and pleasure and every family was filled with happiness at these times.

Ugadhi was uniquely celebrated  and special in whole Telangana.famously known as "Non veg Ugadhi".Bullock cart exhibition was one more special attraction. Many people attend for this event from nearby villages.

It is an agricultural town with a small sized food processing industry, mainly rice mills, and vegetable oil mills. Wet paddy is the major crop, other crops include red chili peppers, cotton, green gram, castor and other vegetables and pulses. It is a developing town. Marketing of natural goods is the major source. There are many Banks, petrol pumps, Function halls and schools. 

Paddy and cotton marketing is the major resource.

Weekend Market (అంగడి ): Every Sunday there will be a local weekend Market (called "అంగడి" in Local Language Telugu) is conducted. This market is famous for sale of Animals used for agriculture, vegetables, clothes and common groceries.

Mandal Details 
The Mothkur mandal consists of 10 villages:
 Anajipuram 
 Musipatla
 Panakabanda
 Ragibavi
 Dathapagudam
 Paladugu
 Podichedu
 Dacharam
 Patimatla
 Sadarshapur

Notable Persons 
 KASOJU SRIKANTH CHARY the first Martyr in Telangana Statehood movement was proud son of Poduchedu in mothkur mandal.
 Late Shri Kalvala Narahari Rao (1891–1942) was Vathandar (Mali Patel) in Nizam government, great Philanthropist, and a landed gentry. Developed community common water wells, community marriage system, temples, various charities. At times risked his personal welfare and went against Nizam Revenue officer and allowed to develop wet lands by conserving water bodies . Very instrumental in organizing and celebrating major festivals like Ugadhi, Dasara, Bonalu for the harmony of the village in all levels.Still people are fallowing tradition established by late Sri Kalvala Nrahari Rao .
 Late Shri Kalvala Prabhakar Rao, Ex-Member of Parliament Rajya Sabha(1986–1992). in his tenure built a road bridge between Mothkur and Gundala mandal and Water resource to Agriculture for SCs
 Late M.Ranga Reddy worked as Secretary Hyderabad Cricket Association and Vice President of BCCI
 Konatham BakkaReddy , a popular Communist party leader.
 Suddala Hanumanthu from Paladugu.
 Pranayraj Vangari: Telugu Theatre Research Scholar, Telugu Wikipedia Administrator and Chief Secretary of "Popcorn Theatre" group.

References

External links 

Villages in Yadadri Bhuvanagiri district
Mandal headquarters in Yadadri Bhuvanagiri district